Ab Piyazi (also Romanized as Āb Pīyāzī) is a village in Dehdasht-e Gharbi Rural District, in the Central District of Kohgiluyeh County, Kohgiluyeh and Boyer-Ahmad Province, Iran. In 2006, its population was 14, in 4 families.

References 

Populated places in Kohgiluyeh County